The Smokefree Environments and Regulated Products Act 1990 (originally the Smoke-free Environments Act 1990) is an Act of Parliament in New Zealand. The Act placed smoking restrictions on indoor spaces, banned smoking on public transport and established the Health Sponsorship Council. The bill was introduced by Helen Clark, then Minister of Health and later Prime Minister. Clark would later refer to the law as "one of my proudest achievements as a politician". It was amended by the Smoke-free Environments Amendment Act 2003, which completely eliminated smoking in workspaces, and again by the Smokefree Environments and Regulated Products (Vaping) Amendment Act 2020, which renamed the Act and brought it "up to date".

See also
Smoking in New Zealand

References

External links
Text of the Act
Ministry of Health - Smokefree Law in New Zealand

Statutes of New Zealand
Smoking in New Zealand
1990 in New Zealand law
Tobacco control